Albert Yates Olds (8 September 1891 – 22 June 1953) was an Australian rules footballer for who played for the Port Adelaide Football Club in the South Australian Football League (SAFL). He captained the club in 1920.

References

1891 births
South Broken Hill Football Club players
West Broken Hill Football Club players
Port Adelaide Football Club (SANFL) players
Port Adelaide Football Club players (all competitions)
Australian rules footballers from South Australia
1953 deaths